Carex pilosa, called hairy sedge (a name it shares with other members of its genus), is a species of flowering plant in the genus Carex, native to central and eastern Europe as far as the Urals. It is typically found in temperate forests, where it may be the dominant species on the forest floor.

References

pilosa
Flora of Europe
Plants described in 1771